Ray Rogers may refer to:

Ray Rogers (archer), American archer
Ray Rogers (labor activist) (born 1944), American labor rights activist
Ray Rogers (politician) (1931–2020), American politician
Raymond Rogers (1927–2005), American chemist
Raymond R. Rogers, professor of geology

See also
Raymond Rodgers (disambiguation)